Charles Barker may refer to:

Charles Barker (advertising agent) (1791–1859), English advertising agent
Charles Barker (cricketer) (1847–1891), English cricketer
Charles Barker (legislator), American politician
Charles H. Barker (1935–1953), American Korean War soldier
Charles S. Barker (1805–1879), British inventor and organ builder
Charles Barker (politician) or Don Barker (1904–1956), Australian Labor Party politician